Beaufortia is a genus of gastromyzontid loaches from China and mainland Southeast Asia.

Species 
There are currently 16 species recognized in this genus though the generic placement of some and validity of others are questionable:
 Beaufortia buas (Đ. Y. Mai, 1978) (species inquirenda in Beaufortia)
 Beaufortia cyclica Yi-Yu Chen, 1980
 Beaufortia daon (Đ. Y. Mai, 1978)
 Beaufortia elongata (Đ. Y. Mai, 1978)
 Beaufortia huangguoshuensis C. Y. Zheng & W. Zhang, 1987
 Beaufortia intermedia W. Q. Tang & D. Z. Wang, 1997
 Beaufortia kweichowensis (P. W. Fang, 1931)
 Beaufortia leveretti (Nichols & C. H. Pope, 1927)
 Beaufortia liui H. W. Chang, 1944
 Beaufortia loos (Đ. Y. Mai, 1978) (species inquirenda in Beaufortia)
 Beaufortia niulanensis Z. M. Chen, Y. F. Huang & J. X. Yang, 2009
 Beaufortia pingi (P. W. Fang, 1930)
 Beaufortia polylepis Y. R. Chen, 1982
 Beaufortia szechuanensis (P. W. Fang, 1930)
 Beaufortia yunnanensis (W. X. Li, Zong-Min Lu & W. N. Mao, 1988) (species inquirenda in Beaufortia)
 Beaufortia zebroidus (P. W. Fang, 1930)

References 

 
Taxa named by Sunder Lal Hora
Gastromyzontidae